Hendrika Wilhelmina Jacoba van der Pek, later Hendrika Schaap (9 January 1867 – 23 August 1926), was a Dutch painter. Her work was part of the painting event in the art competition at the 1932 Summer Olympics. She was married to the artist Egbert Schaap.

References

1867 births
1926 deaths
20th-century Dutch painters
Dutch women painters
Olympic competitors in art competitions
Painters from Amsterdam
20th-century Dutch women